Night Visitor (produced under the title Never Cry Devil) is a 1989 American thriller film directed by Rupert Hitzig, produced by Alain Silver, and starring Richard Roundtree, Elliott Gould, Allen Garfield, and Derek Rydall.

Plot
High school student Billy Colton (Derek Rydall) is spying on his attractive new neighbor (Shannon Tweed) when he witnesses her being murdered by a man in a robe, and he recognizes the man as his unpopular history teacher Zachary Willard (Allen Garfield). Because he has a history of pranks and conflict with Willard, the police do not believe him. Threatened by Willard and his deranged brother Stanley (Michael J. Pollard), who are cultists and serial murderers, Billy convinces retired investigator Ronald 'Ron' Devereaux (Elliott Gould) to help him find hard evidence.

Cast
 Richard Roundtree as Captain Crane
 Elliott Gould as Ronald 'Ron' Devereaux
 Michael J. Pollard as Stanley Willard
 Allen Garfield as Zachary Willard
 Derek Rydall as Billy Colton
 Henry Gibson as Jake
 Shannon Tweed as Lisa Grace
 Bruce Kimmel as Townsend
 Brooke Bundy as Mrs. Colton
 Kathleen Bailey as Dolan
 Scott Fults as Sam Loomis
 Teresa Vander Woulde as Kelly Fremont
 Michael Jason Rosen (Michael Rosen) as Bernstein
 Jovanni Brascia as Tony
 Alain Silver (as Alain Joel Silver) as Thornhill
 Amy Waddell as Annie Hayworth
 Ann Dane as Theresa
 Nancy McLendon as Reporter
 Teri Weigel as Victim in Cellar
 Kathryn Kimler as Second Victim

Reception
The movie was briefly released by MGM/UA on 200 screens (none of which were in New York or Los Angeles) and garnered mixed reviews, many of which expressed humorous appreciation for a basement confrontation between Gould's Devereaux and Pollard's Stanley, while others disparaged the sequence as "a badly choreographed fight between a chainsaw wielding Pollard and a shotgun toting Gould that probably read really well in the script, but looks terrible on film." A later reviewer was more favorably disposed: "Combine Rear Window with late 80s Satanic conspiracy theories and this is the result.  Not as bad as it sounds, Night Visitor is an unfairly obscure movie about Satanism in suburbia."

External links

References

1989 films
1989 horror films
1980s psychological thriller films
American psychological horror films
United Artists films
1980s English-language films
1980s American films